The cerrado red-nosed mouse (Wiedomys cerradensis) is a rodent species from South America. It is known from one locality in Bahia, eastern Brazil. The species was found in semi-deciduous forest in the cerrado ecoregion.

References

Wiedomys
Mammals of Brazil
Mammals described in 2005
Endemic fauna of Brazil
Fauna of the Cerrado